Sagiv Cohen may refer to:

 Sagiv Cohen (musician) (born 1975), Israeli singer
 Sagiv Cohen (footballer) (born 1987), Israeli professional footballer